Barysiai is a village in the eldership of Gataučiai, in the Joniškis district municipality in Šiauliai County, Lithuania. It is 19 km away from the city of Joniškis and 4 km away from the town of Meškuičiai. According to a 2011 census, 12 people live in Barysiai.

Gallery

References

Villages in Šiauliai County